Everybody Say Kimchi is a 2014 South Korean morning comedy-drama series starring Kim Ji-young, Kim Ho-jin, Won Ki-joon, and Cha Hyun-jung. It aired on MBC from April 7 to October 31, 2014, on Mondays to Fridays at 7:50 a.m. for 120 episodes.

Plot
Yoo Ha-eun takes on the challenge of starting a kimchi business after being betrayed by her husband, lawyer Im Dong-joon. As she devotes her life to making quality kimchi, Ha-eun encounters resistance from Park Hyun-ji, the executive director of a rival conglomerate, as well as from her ex-husband. But unbeknownst to her, the owner of a neighboring farm, Shin Tae-kyung, secretly helps her and the two later fall in love.

Cast
 Kim Ji-young as Yoo Ha-eun
 Kim Ho-jin as Shin Tae-kyung
 Won Ki-joon as Im Dong-joon
Cha Hyun-jung as Park Hyun-ji
Lee Hyo-choon as Na Eun-hee
Yoon Hye-kyung as Yoo Ji-eun
Seo Kwang as Jang Se-chan
 Roh Joo-hyun as Park Jae-han
 Lee Bo-hee as Ji Sun-young
Myung Ji-yeon as Im Soo-jin
Choi Ji-won as Im Da-yool
Song Ah-young as Gong Ha-neul
Park Dong-bin as Bae Yong-seok
Lee Woong-hee
Kim Byung-wook
Park Cho-eun
Noh Soo-ram
Min Joon-hyun as lawyer colleague
 Gong Hyung-jin as Kang Se-hoon (cameo)
Hwang Dong-joo as Joo Hyun-do (cameo)
 Park Si-eun as Han Yoon-jin (cameo)

Awards and nominations

References

External links
 
Everybody Say Kimchi at MBC Global Media

MBC TV television dramas
2014 South Korean television series debuts
2014 South Korean television series endings
Korean-language television shows
South Korean romance television series
South Korean comedy television series
Television series by MBC C&I